The Hungary women's national under-16 and under-17 basketball team is a national basketball team of Hungary, administered by the Hungarian Basketball Federation. It represents the country in women's international under-16 and under-17 (under age 16 and under age 17) basketball competitions.

World Cup record

See also
Hungary women's national basketball team
Hungary women's national under-19 basketball team
Hungary men's national under-17 basketball team

References

External links

Archived records of Hungary team participations

under
Women's national under-17 basketball teams